Chemist Direct is a UK-based company providing medical products and services in addition to beauty products online. 

Founded in 2007, it received funding from technology investment firm Atomico in 2013.

History
Chemist Direct initially started in Westminster in 2007 and was launched by entrepreneur Mitesh Soma and his wife Krishna Soma, a UK registered pharmacist. During its early days, the company started out with the primary goal of providing a wide range of products at discounted prices. At the beginning of 2008 Mitesh, his wife, and their team of four moved from Westminster to Leicester and began to expand the business and build a larger team.

Growth and current status
In 2009, Chemist Direct caught the attention of Atomico, the VC firm founded by Skype's Niklas Zennström which specialises in technology investments. Atomico made an investment of £3m, allowing Chemist Direct to strengthen their team and develop a wider product range.

In 2011, Mitesh Soma recruited Stuart Rowe, who previously had spent six years as the managing director of Play.com and before that the e-commerce director of HMV, as the chief executive of Chemist Direct.

Chemist Direct is now one of Europe's largest online chemists, with over 50 staff members at its  warehouse in Birmingham, as well as a professional team of pharmacists and product buyers. They have over one million customers and sell more than 20,000 products online. The company has also widened its product ranges to include nursery equipment, pet food, organic skincare, mother and baby products, sports supplements, grooming and healthcare products, electricals, and household cleaning products.

In July 2016, it announced a merger with Pharmacy2U.

References

Online retailers of the United Kingdom
Retail companies established in 2007
Internet properties established in 2007
Pharmacies of the United Kingdom
Online pharmacies
Companies based in Leicester